The Islamic Heritage Museum is a museum in Kuching, Sarawak, Malaysia. It is part of the Kuching Heritage Trail.

History
The museum was originally constructed as the James Brooke Malay College school building. It was then later changed to the Sarawak Malay Madrasa in 1930. In 1992, the building was converted into the Islamic Heritage Museum on 22 May 1992.

Architecture
The museum building uses raised floor and it has two inner courtyards. The material used for the building construction are concrete, timber and bricks. It consists of seven galleries, which are:
 History of Islam in Sarawak
 Islamic Architecture
 Islamic Science, Technology, Economy, Education and Literature
 Islamic Costume, Music and Personal Collections
 Islamic Weaponry
 Islamic Decoration Art and Domestic Utensil
 Quran Collections

Exhibitions
The museum exhibits the history and culture of the Muslim community in Sarawak and Malay archipelago, such as the development of Islam.

Opening time
The museum opens everyday from 9:00 a.m. to 4:45 p.m. on weekdays and from 10:00 a.m. to 4:00 p.m. on weekends free of charge.

See also
 List of museums in Malaysia
 Islam in Malaysia

References

Buildings and structures in Kuching
Islamic museums in Malaysia
Museums established in 1992
Museums in Sarawak
Religious buildings and structures completed in 1930